TDC may refer to:

Organisations
 Hong Kong Trade Development Council
 Taiwan Design Center, an art organization based in Taipei, Taiwan
 TDC A/S, a Danish telecommunications company
 Teradata Corporation (U.S. ticker symbol)
 Texas Department of Criminal Justice, formerly the Texas Department of Corrections
 Type Directors Club, an international organization specialising in typography
 Theta Delta Chi, a social fraternity founded at Union College, New York, US
 The Discovery Channel, former name of Discovery Channel

Places
 Tristan da Cunha, both a remote group of volcanic islands in the south Atlantic Ocean and the main island of that group
 Tokyo Dome City, an entertainment complex in Tokyo, Japan
 Toronto-Dominion Centre, a cluster of buildings in Toronto, Ontario, Canada

Technology
 Time-to-digital converter, a device in signal processing
 Top dead center, the position farthest from the crankshaft of a piston in a reciprocating engine, see Dead centre (engineering)
 Torpedo Data Computer, a piece of naval technology

Other uses
 Total delivery cost, the amount of money it takes for a company to manufacture and deliver a product
 Trophée des Champions, a French association football trophy
 The Death Cure, a science fiction novel by American writer James Dashner 
 Trainee Detective Constable, the most junior British police Criminal Investigation Department (CID) rank; See Police ranks of the United Kingdom